Olo is a town in Western Equatoria State, South Sudan.

Olo is also the seat of the Anglican diocese of Olo.  The bishop of the Diocese of Olo is Bishop Tandema Obed Andrew. and the diocese was formed in 2009.

References

Populated places in South Sudan